Agdistis glaseri is a moth in the family Pterophoridae. It is known from Spain.

The wingspan is 24–26 mm. The forewings are grey and the hindwings are white.

References

Agdistinae
Moths described in 1978